Lü Bin (born 18 October 1994) is a Chinese professional boxer who challenged for the WBA light-flyweight title in 2018. As an amateur he won a bronze medal at 2013 Asian Amateur Championships in the light-flyweight division and represented China at the 2016 Summer Olympics, reaching the round of 16.

Amateur career

Highlights
Gold Medal (Light flyweight) at the 2012 AIBA Youth World Boxing Championships in Yerevan
Bronze Medal (Light flyweight) at the 2013 Asian Amateur Boxing Championships in Amman
Represented China at the 2016 Rio Olympic Games as a Light flyweight. Results were:
Lost to Peter Mungai Warui (Kenya) 1-2

Professional career

Bin turned professional in 2017 and won by knockout on his debut before challenging Venezuelan boxer Carlos Cañizales for the WBA light flyweight (Regular) title in his second professional fight. Had Bin been won he would've beaten the record set by Saensak Muangsurin and Vasyl Lomachenko by 1 fight by becoming world champion in his second fight.

Professional boxing record

References

External links
 
 
 

1994 births
Living people
Chinese male boxers
Light-flyweight boxers
Olympic boxers of China
Boxers at the 2016 Summer Olympics
Asian Games competitors for China
Boxers at the 2014 Asian Games
People from Yongkang, Zhejiang
Sportspeople from Zhejiang
21st-century Chinese people